Munib Akhtar (born 14 December 1963) is a Pakistani jurist who serves as Justice of the Supreme Court of Pakistan since 8 May 2018.

He is a son-in-law of former Pakistani law minister Khalid Anwer.

Akhtar graduated with an A.B. in economics from Princeton University in 1986 after completing a 150-page long senior thesis titled "Pakistan and South Korea 1947 -- 1970: A Comparative Analysis of Economic Development."

References

1963 births
Living people
Justices of the Supreme Court of Pakistan
Pakistani judges
Princeton University alumni
Judges of the Sindh High Court